Calosoma usgentensis is a species of ground beetle in the subfamily of Carabinae. It was described by Solskyi in 1874.

References

usgentensis
Beetles described in 1874